Al Naft Sport Club is an Iraqi professional sports club based in the Adhamiyah District, East Districts of the Tigris River, Baghdad. Their football team plays in the highest division in Iraq which is the Iraqi Premier League, which they have never been relegated from.

History 
Al-Naft Sports Club was established in 1979 by the Ministry of Oil, and was officially registered in the Ministry of Youth and Sports in 1982. In the 1985 season the team played in the Iraqi Premier League for the first time, and finished in the penultimate position that season, and have remained in the Premier League since then. The club's football team has not won any trophies, but they were runners-up of the Al-Nasr wal-Salam Cup in 1996, the Durand Cup in 1996, the Iraqi Elite Cup in 1998, and the Iraqi Premier League in 2017, and qualified to play in the Arab Club Champions Cup. In the 2018–19 Arab Club Champions Cup, Al-Naft managed to overcome the Tunisian club: CS Sfaxien and expelled it from the championship and qualify for the round 16, but then lost to the Saudi club: Al-Hilal, and left the tournament.

Honours

Domestic

National
Iraqi Premier League
 Runners-up (1): 2016–17
Iraqi Elite Cup
 Runners-up (1): 1998

International
Arab Club Champions Cup: 1 appearance
Second Round: 2018–19
Durand Cup (India)
 Runners-up (1): 1996

Current squad

First-team squad

Out on loan

Personnel

Current technical staff 
{| class="toccolours"
!bgcolor=silver|Position
!bgcolor=silver|Name
!bgcolor=silver|Nationality
|- bgcolor=#eeeeee
|Manager:||Basim Qasim||
|- 
|Assistant manager:||Mohammed Jasim||
|- bgcolor=#eeeeee
|Goalkeeping coach:||Ghanim Ibrahim||
|-bgcolor=#eeeeee
|Fitness coach:||Nasir Abdul-Ameer||
|- 
| Director of football:||Mushtak Kadhim||
|-
|U-19 Manager:||Salam Touma||
|-

Board members 
{| class="toccolours"
!bgcolor=silver|Position
!bgcolor=silver|Name
!bgcolor=silver|Nationality
|-bgcolor=#eeeeee
|President:||Moatasem Akram Hassan||
|-
|Vice-president:||Kadhim Mohammed Sultan||
|-bgcolor=#eeeeee
|Member of the Board:||Falah Abdul Zahra||
|- 
|Member of the Board:||Mohammad Jaber Hassan||
|- bgcolor=#eeeeee
|Member of the Board:||Jalil Farhan||
|-
|Member of the Board:||Shaker Abboud||
|-bgcolor=#eeeeee
|Member of the Board:||Adel Hussein||
|-
|Member of the Board:||Falah Khashan||
|-bgcolor=#eeeeee
|Member of the Board:||Rana Abdul Rahman||
|-

Kit suppliers

Managerial history
Since the club’s promotion to the Iraqi Premier League in the 1985–86 season so far, twenty six coaches have led the team:

 Fakhri Mohammed Salman 
 Dhargham Mahdi Al-Haidari 
 Khalaf Hassan 
 Kadhim Al-Rubaie 
 Wathiq Naji 
 Anwar Jassam 
 Jamal Salih 
 Anwar Jassam 
 Mejbel Fartous 
 Amer Jameel 
 Abdelilah Abdul-Hameed 
 Nadhim Shaker 
 Amer Jameel 
 Razzak Khazal 
 Mohammed Ali Al-Sheikhli 
 Maad Ibrahim 
 Hamed Salman 
 Mohammed Tabra 
 Ali Hussein Yassin 
 Abdelilah Abdul-Hameed 
 Wathiq Aswad 
 Jabar Hamed 
 Mohammed Ali Al-Sheikhli 
 Hamed Salman 
 Salam Hashim 
 Hamed Salman 
 Mohammed Ali Al-Sheikhli 
 Mohammed Jassim 
 Younis Abid Ali 
 Sabah Abdul-Jalil 
 Hamed Salman 
 Sabah Abdul-Jalil 
 Ali Wahab 
 Sabah Abdul-Jalil 
 Nadhim Shaker 
 Shaker Mahmoud 
 Jamal Ali 
 Basim Qasim 
 Sabah Abdul-Jalil 
 Thair Jassam 
 Hassan Ahmed  
 Basim Qasim 
 Yahya Alwan 
 Basim Qasim

References

External links
 Iraq Clubs- Foundation Dates

Football clubs in Iraq
Sport in Baghdad
1979 establishments in Iraq
Football clubs in Baghdad